South Arkansas Regional Airport at Goodwin Field  is nine miles west of El Dorado, in Union County, Arkansas, United States. It was served by SeaPort Airlines, a service subsidized by the federal government's Essential Air Service program at a cost of $1,977,153 (per year). SeaPort Airlines ceased operations on September 20, 2016.

The National Plan of Integrated Airport Systems for 2021–2025 categorized it as a general aviation airport (the commercial service category requires at least 2,500 enplanements per year).

The first airline flights were on Chicago and Southern in 1945; Trans-Texas arrived in 1953 and Delta/C&S soon pulled out. The last TI Convair 600 left in 1977.

Facilities
The airport covers 1,590 acres (642 ha) at an elevation of 277 feet (84 m). It has two active asphalt runways: 4/22 is 6,601 by 150 feet (2,012 x 46 m) and 13/31 is 5,100 by 100 feet (1,554 x 30 m). Former runway 17/35 is closed; it had a concrete surface measuring 3,733 by 75 feet (1,138 x 23 m).

In the year ending July 31, 2020 the airport had 18,020 aircraft operations, an average of 49 per day: 78% general aviation, 11% commercial, 8% air taxi and 3% military. In April 2022, there were 19 aircraft based at this airport: 11 single-engine, 2 multi-engine, 5 jet and 1 helicopter.

Airline and destinations

Statistics

See also 
 Goodwin Field Administration Building

References

Other sources 

 Essential Air Service documents (Docket OST-1997-2935) from the U.S. Department of Transportation:
 Order 2005-1-14: selecting Air Midwest, Inc., to provide essential air service at El Dorado/Camden, Jonesboro, Harrison and Hot Springs, Arkansas, at a subsidy rate of $4,155,550 annually for a two-year rate term.
 Order 2007-1-7: selecting Air Midwest, Inc. to provide essential air service at El Dorado/Camden, Jonesboro, Harrison and Hot Springs, Arkansas, at a subsidy rate of $4,296,348 annually for the two-year rate term beginning April 1, 2007.
 Order 2009-6-25: tentatively selecting Alaska Juneau Aeronautics, Inc. d/b/a SeaPort Airlines (SeaPort) to provide subsidized essential air service (EAS) at El Dorado/Camden, Harrison, Hot Springs, and Jonesboro, Arkansas, for two years.
 Order 2009-7-8: making final the tentative selection of Alaska Juneau Aeronautics, Inc. d/b/a SeaPort Airlines, to provide essential air service at El Dorado/Camden, Harrison, Hot Springs, and Jonesboro, Arkansas.

External links 
 South Arkansas Regional Airport, official website
 South Arkansas Regional at Goodwin Field (ELD) from Arkansas Department of Aeronautics
 Aerial image as of 30 January 2001 from USGS The National Map
 

Airports in Arkansas
Essential Air Service
Transportation in Union County, Arkansas
Buildings and structures in Union County, Arkansas